There are several stadiums in Pakistan that have been named after Quaid-e-Azam Muhammad Ali Jinnah. The following is list of Quaid e Azam stadiums in Pakistan:

 Jinnah Stadium (Gujranwala)
 Quaid-e-Azam Stadium

Pakistan
Stadiums in Pakistan